Thomas Bilcliffe Fyler MP (12 September 1788 – 4 March 1838) was a British Tory politician who represented Coventry in the House of Commons from 10 June 1826 to 25 July 1831.

Early life

Fyler was an army officer and barrister. He attended Winchester School 1799-1806, before going up to Christ Church, Oxford then to Lincoln's Inn

Parliamentary career

Fyler was first elected at the 1826 general election as a 'no Popery' Tory, opposing Catholic emancipation and supported by the corporation of the City of Coventry 

Fyler was re-elected unopposed at the 1830 general election

He gave his maiden speech opposing the use of impressment by the Royal Navy. He was opposed to radical parliamentary reform and spoke against the introduction of annual parliaments, election by ballot and universal suffrage but favoured moderate reform such as the enfranchisement of cities. Fyler was an opponent of the Corn Laws and spoke in the House of Commons on the subject of the distress caused by the Laws to working people.

Fyler left the House of Commons at the 1831 general election where he lost his seat to Henry Bulwer, a Whig, who was a more enthusiastic supporter of parliamentary reform. Fyler unsuccessfully contested the Coventry seat again at the general election of 1832

References 

Members of Parliament for Coventry
1788 births
1838 deaths
People educated at Winchester College
Alumni of Christ Church, Oxford
English army officers
English barristers
19th-century English politicians
Anti-Catholic activists